The Aethiopica ('Ethiopian Stories') or Theagenes and Chariclea is an ancient Greek novel which has been dated to the 220s or 370s AD. It was written by Heliodorus of Emesa and is his only known work.

Author
The author of the Aethiopica identifies himself upon ending his work in this manner:

According to Richard L. Hunter,

In the words of Tim Whitmarsh,  "looks like a claim to hereditary priesthood," although "uncertainties" remain. According to The Cambridge History of Classical Literature, "the personal link here established between the writer and Helios has also a literary purpose, as has Calasiris' flashback narrative" .
The later tradition maintaining that Heliodorus had become a Christian bishop is likely fictional.

Circulation and Western rediscovery

The novel continued to circulate during the Middle Ages amid the Greek readership in the Byzantine Empire. For example, it is mentioned in the will, dated 1059, of protospatharios Eustathios Voilas, to be bequeathed among several of his books to a monastery which he had founded.

The Aethiopica was first brought to light in Western Europe during the Renaissance in a manuscript from the library of Matthias Corvinus, found at the sack of Buda (now the western part of Budapest) in 1526, and printed at Basel in 1534. Other codices have since been discovered.

It was first translated into French by the celebrated Jacques Amyot in 1547.  It was first translated into English in 1569 by Thomas Underdown, who used the 1551 Latin translation of Stanisław Warszewicki to create his Aethiopian Historie. It was printed several times by Gabriele Giolito de' Ferrari in the Republic of Venice (1556, 1560, 1586) in an Italian translation from Greek by Leonardo Ghini.

Style
The Aethiopica is indebted to the works of Homer and Euripides.  The title is taken from the fact that the action of the beginning and end of the story takes place in Aethiopia.

The work is notable for its rapid succession of events, the variety of its characters, its vivid descriptions of manners and of scenery, and its simple, elegant writing style.  But what has been regarded as most remarkable is that the novel opens in the middle of the story ("in medias res"), and the plot is resolved by having various characters describe their prior adventures in retrospective narratives or dialogues, which eventually tie together. Homer utilized this technique in both his epic poems, the Iliad and the Odyssey. This feature makes the Aethiopica stand out from all the other ancient Greek romances.

Plot summary

Chariclea, the daughter of King Hydaspes and Queen Persinna of Ethiopia, was born white through the effect of the sight of a marble statue upon the queen during pregnancy (an instance of the theory of maternal impression). Another version attributes Chariclea's birth to Queen Persinna seeing a painting of a white woman, "brought down by Perseus naked from the rock, and so by mishap engendered presently a thing like to her." The painting shows Andromeda, an Ethiopian princess. Fearing accusations of adultery, Persinna abandons her baby daughter but leaves her with three gifts: an inscribed ribbon with Ethiopic characters, a necklace, and a ring. The ring has magical powers and is described as, "it is set with a jewel called pantarbe and inscribed with certain sacred characters (γράμμασι δὲ ἱεροῖς); it is full, it seems, of a supernatural and mystic property (τελετῆς θειοτέρας) which I think must have endowed the stone with the power to repel fire and bestow immunity from the flames on its wearer.” Sisimithras, a gymnosophist, finds the baby and takes her to Egypt. Sisimithras places her in the care of Charicles, a Pythian priest. Chariclea is then taken to Delphi, and made a priestess of Artemis.

Theagenes, a noble Thessalian, comes to Delphi and the two fall in love. He runs off with Chariclea with the help of Calasiris (kalasiris), an Egyptian who has been employed by Persinna to find Chariclea. They encounter many perils: pirates, bandits, and others. The main characters ultimately meet at Meroë at the very moment when Chariclea is about to be sacrificed to the gods by her own father. Her birth is made known, and the lovers are happily married.

Influence and adaptations
Heliodorus' novel was immensely influential and was imitated by Byzantine Greeks and by French, Italian, and Spanish writers.

The early life of Clorinda in Torquato Tasso's Jerusalem Delivered (canto xii. 21 sqq.) is almost identical with that of Chariclea.

The structure, events, and themes of the European adventure novel of the first half of the seventeenth century—Madeleine de Scudéry, Marin le Roy de Gomberville, Miguel de Cervantes's Persiles and Sigismunda, and likely Aphra Behn's Oroonoko—were directly modeled on Heliodorus's work. It was adapted by the French dramatist Alexandre Hardy under the title Les chastes et loyales amours de Théagène et Cariclée (published in 1623). John Gough, an English dramatist of Charles I's day, based his tragicomedy The Strange Discovery (published in 1640) on the Aethiopica. It was also adapted into an opera with a French libretto by Duché de Vancy and music by Henri Desmarets. French dramatist Jean Racine claimed that Heliodorus' novel was his favorite book and when, after he had joined the ascetic Jansenist retreat Port-Royal and the book had been repeatedly taken away from him, Racine is reported to have said that the loss of the book no longer mattered since he had already memorized it.

The work's influence continued to be felt in the eighteenth century novel (especially in those having a "tale within a tale" structure).

Canadian writer Alice Munro refers to the novel in her short story "Silence" which also explores the theme of a mother detached from her daughter. The story was published in the book Runaway (2004).

Editions
Heliodoros, Aithiopika, ed. Robert Mantle Rattenbury, Thomas Wallace Lumb (Paris: Les Belles Lettres, three volumes, 1935–1943)

See also

Other ancient Greek novelists:
 Chariton – The Loves of Chaereas and Callirhoe
 Xenophon of Ephesus – The Ephesian Tale
 Achilles Tatius – Leucippe and Clitophon
 Longus – Daphnis and Chloe

Notes

References

External links

 Æthiopica – full text (English translation)
 Books 1–5 of History. Ethiopian Story. Book 8: From the Departure of the Divine Marcus (World Digital Library) features Aethiopica and dates back to the 15th century.
 Thomas Underdowne, transl., An Æthiopian History, W. E. Henley, ed. (London, 1895)

Ancient Greek novels
3rd-century books
4th-century books
Greek romance novels